The Scottish College or Scots College at Douai was a seminary founded in Douai, France, for the training of Scottish Roman Catholic exiles for the priesthood. It was modelled on the similar English College there, founded for the same purpose. It has an unfortunate notoriety in consequence of the long dispute between the Jesuits and the secular clergy which centred around it in later times.

History
The Scots College was founded at Tournai, but soon transferred to Pont-à-Mousson. In 1592, Pope Clement VIII directed it to be relocated to Douai; however three years later it again moved to Louvain, where it was located next to the Jesuit College. In 1606, however, it moved again, and it was not until after several further migrations that it settled finally at Douai in 1612.

At the time of the English Civil War, the Scots Colleges tended to support the crown. Many of the students were from families of the nobility and gentry and loyal to the Stuarts. A number of students interrupted their studies to return home and take up arms for the King.

The college was devoid of resources, and it was due to the zealous efforts of Father Parsons in Rome and Madrid, and of Father Creighton in France and Flanders, that numerous benefactions were given and it was placed on a permanent footing. For this reason, the Jesuits afterwards claimed the property as their own, although it was admitted that in its early years secular clergy had been educated there. Appeals and counter-appeals were made, but the question was still unsettled when the Jesuits were expelled from France in 1764. The French Government, however, recognized the claims of the Scottish secular clergy and allowed them to continue the work of the college under a rector chosen from their own body.

Other Scots colleges
 Collegio Scozzese
 Scots College, Paris
 Royal Scots College, Madrid

See also
 English College, Douai
 Irish College, Douai
 University of Douai
 List of Jesuit sites

References

Sources
H. de Ridder-Symoens, "The Place of the University of Douai in the Peregrinatio Academica Britannica", in Lines of Contact (nr 117) 21–34.

Catholic seminaries
1594 establishments in France
Scottish College

fr:Collège des Écossais